Tonka Ivanova Petrova (born 1 February 1947, Yambol) is a Bulgarian middle-distance runner.

She won a silver medal at European Indoor Championships in the 1500 metres run in Rotterdam in 1973. In 1974, she won a gold medal at the European Indoor Championships' 1500 m run in Gothenburg and a silver medal in a 4 x 392 metres relay race with Bulgaria. She also competed in the women's 1500 metres at the 1972 Summer Olympics.

References

1947 births
Living people
Bulgarian female sprinters
Bulgarian female middle-distance runners
Olympic athletes of Bulgaria
People from Yambol
Athletes (track and field) at the 1972 Summer Olympics
Universiade medalists in athletics (track and field)
Universiade bronze medalists for Bulgaria
Medalists at the 1973 Summer Universiade
21st-century Bulgarian women
20th-century Bulgarian women